PP-214 Multan-IV is a Constituency of Provincial Assembly of Punjab.

General elections 2013

General elections 2008

See also
 PP-213 Multan-III
 PP-215 Multan-V

References

External links
 Election commission Pakistan's official website
 Awazoday.com check result
 Official Website of Government of Punjab

Constituencies of Punjab, Pakistan